ngrep (network grep) is a network packet analyzer written by Jordan Ritter. It has a command-line interface, and relies upon the pcap library and the GNU regex library.

ngrep supports Berkeley Packet Filter (BPF) logic to select network sources or destinations or protocols, and also allows matching patterns or regular expressions in the data payload of packets using GNU grep syntax, showing packet data in a human-friendly way.

ngrep is an open source application, and the source code is available to download from the ngrep site on GitHub. It can be compiled and ported to multiple platforms, it works in many UNIX-like operating systems: Linux, Solaris, illumos, BSD, AIX, and also works on Microsoft Windows.

Functionality
ngrep is similar to tcpdump, but it has the ability to look for a regular expression in the payload of the packet, and show the matching packets on a screen or console. It allows users to see all unencrypted traffic being passed over the network, by putting the network interface into promiscuous mode.

ngrep with an appropriate BPF filter syntax, can be used to debug plain text protocols interactions like HTTP, SMTP, FTP, DNS, among others, or to search for a specific string or pattern, using a  regular expression syntax.

ngrep also can be used to capture traffic on the wire and store pcap dump files, or to read files generated by other sniffer applications, like tcpdump, or wireshark.

ngrep has various options or  command line arguments. 
The ngrep man page in UNIX-like operating systems show a list of available options.

Using ngrep
In these examples, it is assumed that eth0 is the used network interface. 

 Capture network traffic incoming/outgoing to/from eth0 interface and show parameters following HTTP (TCP/80) GET or POST methods
 ngrep -l -q -d eth0 -i "^GET |^POST " tcp and port 80
 Capture network traffic incoming/outgoing to/from eth0 interface and show the HTTP (TCP/80) User-Agent string  
 ngrep -l -q -d eth0 -i "User-Agent: " tcp and port 80
 Capture network traffic incoming/outgoing to/from eth0 interface and show the DNS (UDP/53) querys and responses
 ngrep -l -q -d eth0 -i "" udp and port 53

Security
Capturing raw network traffic from an interface requires special privileges or superuser privileges on some platforms, especially on Unix-like systems. ngrep default behavior is to drop privileges in those platforms, running under a specific unprivileged user.

Like tcpdump, it is also possible to use ngrep for the specific purpose of intercepting and displaying the communications of another user or computer, or an entire network.

A privileged user running ngrep in a server or workstation connected to a device configured with port mirroring on a switch, router, or gateway, or connected to any other device used for network traffic capture on a LAN, MAN, or WAN, can watch all unencrypted information related to login ID's, passwords, or URLs and content of websites being viewed in that network.

Supported protocols
 IPv4 and IPv6, Internet Protocol version 4 and version 6
 TCP, Transmission Control Protocol
 UDP, User Datagram Protocol
 ICMPv4 and ICMPv6, Internet Control Message Protocol version 4 and version 6
 IGMP, Internet Group Management Protocol
 Ethernet, IEEE 802.3
 PPP, Point to Point Protocol
 SLIP, Serial Line Internet Protocol
 FDDI, Fiber Data Distribution Protocol
 Token Ring, IEEE 802.5

See also

 Comparison of packet analyzers
 snoop, a command line packet analyzer included with Solaris and illumos
 dsniff, a packet sniffer and set of traffic analysis tools
 netsniff-ng, a free Linux networking toolkit
 etherape, a network mapping tool that relies on sniffing traffic
 tcptrace, a tool for analyzing the logs produced by tcpdump
 Microsoft Network Monitor, a packet analyzer
 xplico, a network forensics analysis tool

References

External links
Official site for ngrep
Ngrep - Linux man page

Network analyzers
Unix network-related software
Windows security software
MacOS security software
Free software programmed in C
Free network management software
Software using the BSD license